Glossograptidae is an extinct family of graptolites.

Genera
List of genera from Maletz (2014):

†Apoglossograptus Finney, 1978
†Bergstroemograptus Finney & Chen, 1984
†Corynites Kozłowski, 1956
†Corynograptus Hopkinson & Lapworth, 1875
†Corynoides Nicholson, 1867
†Cryptograptus Lapworth, 1880f
†Glossograpsus Emmons, 1855
†Kalpinograptus Jiao, 1977
†Lonchograptus Tullberg, 1880
†Mimograptus Lapworth, 1908 in Elles & Wood (1908)
†Nanograptus Hadding, 1915
†Paraglossograptus Mu in Hsü, 1959
†Rogercooperia Sherwin & Rickards, 2000
†Sinoretiograptus Mu et al., 1974
†Skiagraptus Harris, 1933
†Tonograptus Williams, 1992

References

Graptolites
Prehistoric hemichordate families